Damodar Raao (born 21 August 1977) is an Indian composer, singer, record producer, and live performer. His music genre is about acoustic folk with some traces of Indian classical music.

Career
In 2000, Raao got his first break as a singer in the Hindi film Shaitan Tantrik, which was composed by Nikhil Vinay with lyrics by Vinay Bihari.

In 2007 Raao moved with his family to Mumbai.

In 2008, he composed the music for the low-budget Hindi film Once More, aka Gorakh Dhandha.

Raao has composed more than 75 films in Bhojpuri language, including Dil Ho Gail Qurban, Teri Meri Ashiqui, Sargana Kushi Nagar Rangdari Tax,
Gunday (Bhojpuri), Bagi Ishq, Inspector Chandani, Jungal Raj, Dil Aur Deewar, The Power of Dahshat, Sajan Ki Bahon Me (Bhojpuri), Majnu Motorwala, and Baap Re Baap.

The musical film Teri Meri Ashqui was praised by critics.

Awards and honors
In 2014 Raao received the award for Best Music Director of the Year 2012 by Darshnik Mumbai Press Media Award. He was also honoured by the Aapki Awaz Foundation for Best Music Director & Mumbai Gaurav Award of the year 2014 for the Bhojpuri film Majnu Motorwala. Raao was given the Chhatrapati Shivaji Gaurav Award in 2016 by Darshnik newspaper and Evershine Mitramandal in Mumbai.

In October 2016, Raao reached a record of making 50 filmy albums and devotional albums of various singers.

Discography

Films

Music albums

See also
Bhojpuri cinema

References

External links
 
 

Living people
Indian male singer-songwriters
Indian singer-songwriters
Musicians from Mumbai
Musicians from Bihar
1977 births